Darbhanga Rural Assembly constituency is an assembly constituency in Darbhanga district in the Indian state of Bihar. It is an open seat from 2010 but was earlier reserved for scheduled castes.

Overview
As per Delimitation of Parliamentary and Assembly constituencies Order, 2008, No. 82 Darbhanga Rural Assembly constituency is composed of the following: Manigachhi community development block; Nazra Mohammada, Narayanpur (Advocate Shadab Ahmad s/o Akil Ahmad), Adalpur, Atihar, Balha, Bijuli, Chhotaipatti, Dhoi, Dularpur, Ghorghatta, Kharua, Khutwara, Loam, Muria, Nainaghat, Sonki and Bhalpatti gram panchayats of Darbhanga CD Block.

Darbhanga Rural Assembly constituency is part of No. 14 Darbhanga (Lok Sabha constituency).

Members of Legislative Assembly

Election Results

2015

2020

References

External links
 

Assembly constituencies of Bihar
Politics of Darbhanga district